Bellary Cantonment, was a cantonment area in Madras Presidency in the British Raj. Bellary, today in Karnataka, came under British administration in 1800, and was the headquarters of the Bellary District, in the Southern Division of Madras, in 1840. The Imperial Gazetteer of India (1909) states, "Until the British made Bellary a cantonment it contained little but its fort". Bellary Cantonment, situated to the west of the fort.

The cantonment had golf links, race course, a large military hospital and barracks for all segments of the army. Wellington and Edward Williams served as officers in this cantonment.

After Bellary was merged with the Madras Presidency in 1800, the British wanted to set up three jails here. The first prison was established in 1872 after the First War of Independence and came to be known as the Central Jail. The second, Allipur open-air jail, and third at TB Sanatorium. The prisoners of war (PoW) of the world war were kept here by the British.

As of now the cantonment is without any military activity. Even though, the area is still called as 'Cantonment' and with some urbanization. The Ballari Central Jail is still being used, whereas the other two are closed.

References

Bellary
Madras Presidency
Forts in India
Cantonments of British India